Dixie, Georgia may refer to the following places in the U.S. state of Georgia:
Dixie, Brooks County, Georgia, an unincorporated community and census-designated place
Dixie, Newton County, Georgia, an unincorporated community